Didymodon is a genus of mosses belonging to the family Pottiaceae. The genus has a cosmopolitan distribution..

Species
The following species are recognised in the genus Didymodon:

Didymodon aaronis 
Didymodon acutus 
Didymodon aeneus 
Didymodon aeruginosus 
Didymodon afer 
Didymodon affinis 
Didymodon aggregatus 
Didymodon albicuspis 
Didymodon alticaulis 
Didymodon amblyophyllus 
Didymodon ampliretis 
Didymodon andreaeoides 
Didymodon angustatus 
Didymodon angustulus 
Didymodon anserinocapitatus 
Didymodon apiculatus 
Didymodon argentinicus 
Didymodon argentiniensis 
Didymodon asperifolius 
Didymodon australasiae 
Didymodon austroalpigena 
Didymodon barbulae 
Didymodon barbuloides 
Didymodon bartramii 
Didymodon berthoanus 
Didymodon bistratosus 
Didymodon blyttii 
Didymodon bombayensis 
Didymodon brachyphyllus 
Didymodon brasiliensis 
Didymodon brevicaulis 
Didymodon brevifolius 
Didymodon brevisetus 
Didymodon brunneus 
Didymodon calycinus 
Didymodon calymperidictyon 
Didymodon calyptratus 
Didymodon campylocarpus 
Didymodon camusii 
Didymodon canaliculatus 
Didymodon capensis 
Didymodon capitatus 
Didymodon cardotii 
Didymodon catenulatus 
Didymodon ceratodonteus 
Didymodon challaense 
Didymodon citrinus 
Didymodon constrictus 
Didymodon contortus 
Didymodon coquimbensis 
Didymodon cordatus 
Didymodon crassicostatus 
Didymodon curtus 
Didymodon cuspidatus 
Didymodon cyathicarpus 
Didymodon cylindricus 
Didymodon deciduus 
Didymodon dieckii 
Didymodon ditrichoides 
Didymodon dubius 
Didymodon eckeliae 
Didymodon eckendorfii 
Didymodon epunctatus 
Didymodon erosodenticulatus 
Didymodon erosus 
Didymodon fallax 
Didymodon ferrugineus 
Didymodon filescens 
Didymodon filicaulis 
Didymodon flaccidus 
Didymodon fontanus 
Didymodon formosicus 
Didymodon fragilicuspis 
Didymodon fulvus 
Didymodon funkii 
Didymodon gaochienii 
Didymodon giganteus 
Didymodon glaucoviridis 
Didymodon glaucus 
Didymodon godmanianus 
Didymodon gorodkovii 
Didymodon grimmioides 
Didymodon guineensis 
Didymodon gymnostomus 
Didymodon gymnus 
Didymodon hampei 
Didymodon hastatus 
Didymodon haussknechtii 
Didymodon hedysariformis 
Didymodon hegewaldiorum 
Didymodon heribaudii 
Didymodon herzogii 
Didymodon hostilis 
Didymodon humboldtii 
Didymodon humidus 
Didymodon icmadophilus 
Didymodon imperfectus 
Didymodon incrassatolimbatus 
Didymodon incrassatus 
Didymodon incurvus 
Didymodon insulanus 
Didymodon insularis 
Didymodon interruptus 
Didymodon inundatus 
Didymodon jackvancei 
Didymodon jamesonii 
Didymodon japonicus 
Didymodon johansenii 
Didymodon juniperinus 
Didymodon laevigatus 
Didymodon lamyanus 
Didymodon lapponicus 
Didymodon leskeoides 
Didymodon leucodon 
Didymodon lindigii 
Didymodon lingulatus 
Didymodon littoralis 
Didymodon loeskei 
Didymodon longicaulis 
Didymodon lorentzianus 
Didymodon luehmannii 
Didymodon luridus 
Didymodon luridus 
Didymodon luzonensis 
Didymodon macounii 
Didymodon macrophyllus 
Didymodon mamillosus 
Didymodon marginatus 
Didymodon maschalogena 
Didymodon maximus 
Didymodon merceyoides 
Didymodon mexicanus 
Didymodon microstomus 
Didymodon microthecius 
Didymodon minusculus 
Didymodon mittenii 
Didymodon montanus 
Didymodon montevidensis 
Didymodon moritzianus 
Didymodon mougeotii 
Didymodon murrayae 
Didymodon neesii 
Didymodon neomexicanus 
Didymodon nepalensis 
Didymodon nevadensis 
Didymodon nicholsonii 
Didymodon nigrescens 
Didymodon nitens 
Didymodon norrisii 
Didymodon oblongifolius 
Didymodon occidentalis 
Didymodon oedocostatus 
Didymodon orbignyanus 
Didymodon orientalis 
Didymodon ovatus 
Didymodon pallidobasis 
Didymodon papillatus 
Didymodon papillinervis 
Didymodon papillosus 
Didymodon paramicola 
Didymodon patagonicus 
Didymodon pelichucensis 
Didymodon perexilis 
Didymodon perobtusus 
Didymodon perrevolutus 
Didymodon pichinchensis 
Didymodon planifolius 
Didymodon planotophaceus 
Didymodon platyneurus 
Didymodon plicatus 
Didymodon polycarpus 
Didymodon polycephalus 
Didymodon pottsii 
Didymodon proscriptus 
Didymodon pruinosus 
Didymodon pulvinans 
Didymodon ramulosus 
Didymodon recurvus 
Didymodon reflexus 
Didymodon reticulatus 
Didymodon revolutus 
Didymodon rigidifolius 
Didymodon rigidulus 
Didymodon riparius 
Didymodon rivicola 
Didymodon rubiginosus 
Didymodon rufescens 
Didymodon rufidulus 
Didymodon rupestris 
Didymodon schilleri 
Didymodon schimperi 
Didymodon serrulatus 
Didymodon sicculus 
Didymodon sinuosus 
Didymodon smaragdinus 
Didymodon soaresii 
Didymodon spadiceus 
Didymodon spathulatolinearis 
Didymodon spitsbergensis 
Didymodon starkeanus 
Didymodon stenocarpus 
Didymodon stenopyxis 
Didymodon stewartii 
Didymodon strictorubellus 
Didymodon subalpinum 
Didymodon subandreaeoides 
Didymodon subfontanus 
Didymodon subniger 
Didymodon subrevolutus 
Didymodon subtorquatus 
Didymodon subtriquetrus 
Didymodon subulatus 
Didymodon tasmanicus 
Didymodon taylorii 
Didymodon tectorum 
Didymodon tenellus 
Didymodon tenii 
Didymodon theobaldii 
Didymodon tisserantii 
Didymodon tomaculosus 
Didymodon tophaceopsis 
Didymodon tophaceus 
Didymodon torquatus 
Didymodon trachyneuron 
Didymodon trivialis 
Didymodon ulocalyx 
Didymodon umbrosus 
Didymodon uruguayensis 
Didymodon vinealis 
Didymodon vinealis 
Didymodon virens 
Didymodon vulcanicus 
Didymodon wahlenbergii 
Didymodon warnstorfii 
Didymodon waymouthii 
Didymodon wildii 
Didymodon wisselii 
Didymodon wollei 
Didymodon xanthocarpus 
Didymodon yunnanensis

References

Moss genera
Pottiaceae